John Feldmann (born June 29, 1967) is an American singer, songwriter, guitarist, and record producer. He serves as the lead singer/guitarist of the band Goldfinger.

Early life
Feldmann grew up in Saratoga, California. He started writing songs around the age of 13 or 14. Around that time, he met the band Social Distortion, and was inspired to be like them.

Career 
Feldmann's first band was Saratoga-based Family Crisis. In 1988, he moved to Los Angeles, where he formed the band Electric Love Hogs and met future Goldfinger bassist Kelly LeMieux. The Electric Love Hogs (which also included Dave Kushner of Velvet Revolver and Bobby Hewitt of Orgy) put out one album, their self-titled 1992 debut, which was co-produced by Tommy Lee.

Feldmann formed Goldfinger in Los Angeles in 1994 after meeting original Goldfinger bassist Simon Williams in a shoe store where they were both working. Goldfinger played 385 shows in 1996, breaking the Guinness Book of World Records for the most concerts in one year for a touring band. In 1999, Goldfinger's song "Superman" was featured in the Tony Hawk's Pro Skater video game. Starting with their self-titled debut album in 1996, Goldfinger has released eight studio albums, including Never Look Back, which was released on Big Noise on December 4, 2020.

In 1998, Feldmann began producing for other bands, starting with Showoff, producing their self-titled debut album, followed by Mest and The Used. He produced Story of the Year's 2003 debut album Page Avenue, which was certified Gold by the RIAA and peaked at number 51 on the Billboard 200, and included the hits "Anthem of Our Dying Day" and "Until the Day I Die". He produced and co-wrote Blink-182's 2016 album California, which reached number 1 on the Billboard 200 and was nominated for a Grammy Award for Best Rock Album. He co-wrote and co-produced "Made An America" by The Fever 333, which was nominated for a Grammy Award for Best Rock Performance. He has also co-written and produced for All Time Low, 5 Seconds of Summer, Good Charlotte, Panic! at the Disco, Beartooth, Biffy Clyro, Korn, 311, Black Veil Brides, Avril Lavigne, Ashlee Simpson, Ashley Tisdale, Hilary Duff, Mandy Moore, and Papa Roach. The albums Feldmann has worked on have grossed more than 34 million sales worldwide.

Starting in 1997, Feldmann has worked as an A&R executive at Warner Bros. Records, scouting talent and overseeing artist development. Feldmann is a former A&R consultant for Red Bull Records. In 2016, he became the Vice President of A&R at BMG. Along with Jon Cohen and Nick Gross, Feldmann started the record label Big Noise in 2017.

Feldmann, Travis Barker, and John Reese started Back to the Beach Festival at Huntington State Beach in 2018. The two-day ska and punk festival featured The Mighty Mighty Bosstones, 311, and Sublime With Rome its first year, and was headlined by Blink-182 in 2019, but has not returned after that.

Feldmann is published by Big Noise and managed by Lucas Keller and Nic Warner at Milk & Honey.

Personal life 
Feldmann is a former vegan (now pescatarian) and former activist for animal rights.

Awards

Selected production discography

See also 
Animal rights and punk subculture
 List of animal rights advocates

References

External links 
 

Goldfinger (band) members
1967 births
American animal rights activists
American male singers
Record producers from California
American rock guitarists
American male guitarists
American rock singers
Living people
Punk rock record producers
Guitarists from Los Angeles
Electric Love Hogs members
20th-century American guitarists